Trailwalker or Oxfam Trailwalker and the related Trailtrekker are fundraising endurance events conducted across the world by Oxfam, in which teams of four competitors must complete a course of  in a set time limit - typically between 24 and 48 hours.  The routes may be point-to-point or follow a circular route returning to the start.

History
The event was established in 1981 by Brigadier Mervyn Lee in Hong Kong as a training exercise by the Queen's Gurkha Signals, part of the Brigade of Gurkhas of the British Army, which was at the time based in the British colony.  In 1986, teams of civilians were allowed to take part and Oxfam Hong Kong was invited to co-organise the event.

In 1997, with the handover of Hong Kong to China, the Gurkha regiments were relocated to the United Kingdom. The Trailwalker event followed the Gurkhas' relocation and was organised over the South Downs in Sussex, with Oxfam in the UK acting as partner since 2002, alongside the Gurkha Welfare Trust.  Oxfam Hong Kong continued to organise the original event without the Gurkhas and the event has grown with 17 events now taking place across 10 countries worldwide.

In 2017, Ian Crawford of Petersfield, Hampshire, continuing his support of the Gurkha Welfare Trust and aged 74 years old, completed a record 19th UK Trailwalker in a time of 29hrs 34mins.

Events

Common rules
There are some common rules across all the Trailwalker and Trailtrekker events.
 Each team must have four members, who are required to cross all checkpoints and finish line together, although teams may continue with only three members if one has to retire.
 The Trailwalker event course, referred to as 'the trail,' is 100 kilometres long.
 Participants should also organise a support team, plan and start their training schedule at least three months before the event.
 All teams must raise a minimum sponsorship amount. Failure to raise the stated amount could mean teams do not take part in the scheduled event. Teams failing to meet the required amount approx $1600 are given an opportunity in the next years event with no refunds on entry fees and fund already raised. Teams raising over the threshold will take priority in registering for Oxfam Trailwalker next year.

Macau TrailWalker
In mid-2010, Upward Bound Unlimited (UBU), a Macau-based company which organizes sports tourism events in the Pearl River Delta region, and Macau's main English-language daily newspaper, the Macau Daily Times, announced that a cross-country hiking event called "Macau TrailWalker" would be held later in the year with the support of the local Macau authorities. The event was held on 9 October 2010 on the outer island of Coloane and consisted of a 30 km category and a 12 km category.

Prior to the event, Oxfam Hong Kong issued a press release stating among other things that it was not associated with the event or any of its organizers (nor had it been contacted by them), that it did not approve nor endorse the event, that no sponsorship money from the event would be used in any Oxfam aid work, and that it "reserved the right to take appropriate legal action to protect the Trailwalker name".

References

External links
 Oxfam Trailwalker Hong Kong
 Oxfam Trailwalker Japan
 UK Oxfam Trailwalker
 Oxfam Trailwalker Melbourne
 Oxfam Trailwalker Sydney
 Oxfam Trailwalker Brisbane
 New Zealand Oxfam Trailwalker
 Oxfam Trailwalker France
 Oxfam Trailwalker Canada
 Oxfam Novib Trailwalker Netherlands
 Oxfam Trailwalker Germany
 Oxfam Trailwalker Belgium
 Spain - Intermon Oxfam Trailwalker
  Oxfam Trailwalker India

Sports competitions in Hong Kong
Oxfam
Challenge walks